Armand Montjoye, real name Jules Joseph Montjoye, (Paris, 8 February 1816 – Paris, 13 January 1871) was a 19th-century French painter and playwright.

Biography 
A son of the dancer Louis-Stanislas Montjoie (1789 – 1865), a student of Jean-Dominique Ingres at the École des Beaux-Arts (1832), he first began to paint and exhibited a portrait of his father at the 1835 Salon. In 1839 he realised Jésus tenté par le diable and in 1842 an Autoportrait. These paintings are preserved at the national museum of the Château de Versailles He then embarked into the Theatre (1843).

His plays were presented on the most significant Parisian stages of his time including the Théâtre des Variétés, the Théâtre des Folies-Dramatiques, and the Théâtre de la Gaîté.

Plays 
1843: Le Saut périlleux, vaudeville in 1 act, with Saint-Yves
1848: Almanach Astrologique, Magique, Prophétique, Satirique et des Sciences Occultes. Annuaire du Monde Élégant pour 1848
1849: Les Associés, vaudeville in 1 act, with Charles de La Rounat
1851: Un Monsieur qui n'a pas d'habit, comédie-vaudeville in 2 acts, with Jautard
1852: , comédie-vaudeville in 1 act, with Eugène Labiche and Auguste Lefranc
1852: Une Rivière dans le dos, comédie-vaudeville in 1 act, with Delacour
1853: Un Homme entre deux airs, comédie-vaudeville in 1 act, with Alfred Delacour and de La Rounat
1853: Le Jour de la blanchisseuse, vaudeville in 1 act, with Amédée de Jallais
1853: Pulchriska et Léontino, pochade mingled with couplets, with de La Rounat
1854: Un Fils malgré lui, folie-vaudeville in 2 acts, with Armand-Numa Jautard
1854: Un Roi malgré lui, comedy in 2 acts, mingled with songs, with Jautard
1854: Eva, three-act play mingled with songs, with Raymond Deslandes
1855: Une Panthère de Java, pochade mingled with couplets, with de La Rounat
1855: Le Testament de Polichinelle, opéra-bouffe in 1 act
1856: S'aimer sans y voir, folie-vaudeville in 1 act
1864: Ajax et sa blanchisseuse, comédie vaudeville in 3 acts, with Eugène Grangé and Alexandre Charles Chaulieu, 1864
1864: Une Femme qui ne vient pas; scène de la vie de garçon

Paintings 
1835: Portrait de Louis-Stanislas Montjoie
1835: François de Bourbon, comte de Vendôme (1470-1495), Musée national des Châteaux de Versailles et de Trianon.
1839: Jésus tenté par le diable
1839: Portrait de l'architecte Latapie, Musée national du château de Pau.
1842: Autoportrait
1843: Bonaparte, Conseil général de l'Indre (Châteauroux).
c.1849: Saint Louis après la bataille de Damiette, église paroissiale Saint-Pierre de Saint-Arnoult-en-Yvelines.
undated: Trompette de Carabiniers à cheval, (watercolour)
1860: Empereur Napoléon III, city-hall Le Mans.

Bibliography 
 Emmanuel Bénézit, Dictionnaire critique et documentaire des peintres, 1956, (p. 288)

References 

19th-century French painters
French male painters
19th-century French dramatists and playwrights
1816 births
Writers from Paris
1871 deaths
19th-century French male artists